Triruthenium dodecacarbonyl is the chemical compound with the formula Ru3(CO)12.   Classified as metal carbonyl cluster, it is a dark orange-colored solid that is soluble in nonpolar organic solvents.  The compound serves as a precursor to other organoruthenium compounds.

Structure and synthesis
The cluster has D3h symmetry, consisting of an equilateral triangle of Ru atoms, each of which bears two axial and two equatorial CO ligands.  Os3(CO)12 has the same structure, whereas Fe3(CO)12 is different, with two bridging CO ligands, resulting in C2v symmetry.

Ru3(CO)12 is prepared by treating solutions of ruthenium trichloride with carbon monoxide in the presence of a base. Dichlororuthenium tricarbonyl dimer is an intermediate. The stoichiometry of the reaction is uncertain, one possibility being the following:
6 RuCl3  +  33 CO  +  18 CH3OH  →  2 Ru3(CO)12  +  9 CO(OCH3)2  +  18 HCl

Reactions
The chemical properties of Ru3(CO)12 have been widely studied, and the cluster has been converted to hundreds of derivatives. High pressures of CO convert the cluster to the monomeric ruthenium pentacarbonyl, which reverts to the parent cluster upon standing.
Ru3(CO)12  +  3 CO    3 Ru(CO)5      Keq = 3.3 x 10−7 mol dm−3 at room temperature
The instability of Ru(CO)5 contrasts with the robustness of the corresponding Fe(CO)5.  The condensation of Ru(CO)5 into Ru3(CO)12 proceeds via initial, rate-limiting loss of CO to give the unstable, coordinatively unsaturated species Ru(CO)4.  This tetracarbonyl binds Ru(CO)5, initiating the condensation.

Upon warming under a pressure of hydrogen, Ru3(CO)12 converts to the tetrahedral cluster H4Ru4(CO)12.  Ru3(CO)12 undergoes substitution reactions with Lewis bases:
Ru3(CO)12  +  n L  →  Ru3(CO)12-nLn  +  n CO (n = 1, 2, or 3)
where L is a tertiary phosphine or an isocyanide.  It forms complexes with acenaphthylene.

 forms a variety of alkene complexes, some where the Ru3 core remains intact but often with fragmentation.  Upon treatment with 1,5-cyclooctadiene gives the monoRu tricarbonyl derivative:

Ru-carbido clusters
At high temperatures, Ru3(CO)12 converts to a series of clusters that contain interstitial carbido ligands.  These include Ru6C(CO)17 and Ru5C(CO)15.  Anionic carbido clusters are also known, including [Ru5C(CO)14]2− and the bioctahedral cluster [Ru10C2(CO)24]2−.  Ru3(CO)12 -derived carbido compounds have been used to synthesize nanoparticles for catalysis. These particles consist of 6-7 atoms and thus are all surface, resulting in extraordinary activity.

References

Organoruthenium compounds
Carbonyl complexes
Chemical compounds containing metal–metal bonds